A general election has held in the U.S. state of New Mexico on November 3, 2020. To vote by mail, registered New Mexico voters must have requested a ballot by October 30, 2020.

Federal offices

U.S. President

U.S. Senate

U.S. House of Representatives 

|-
! 
| Deb Haaland
|  | Democratic
| 2018
| Incumbent re-elected.
| nowrap | 

|-
! 
| Xochitl Torres Small
|  | Democratic
| 2018
|  | Incumbent lost re-election.New member elected.Republican gain.
| nowrap | 

|-
! 
| Ben Ray Luján
|  | Democratic
| 2008
|  | Incumbent retired.New member elected.Democratic hold.
| nowrap | 

|}

State offices

State Legislature 

All of the seats of the New Mexico Senate and the New Mexico House of Representatives were up for election in 2020. Democrats held control of both chambers, maintaining a government trifecta.

Judicial offices

Supreme Court

Position 1
Justice Shannon Bacon ran for a full term after being appointed by Governor Michelle Lujan Grisham on January 25, 2019.

Position 2
Justice David Thomson ran for a full term after being appointed by Governor Michelle Lujan Grisham on January 25, 2019.

Court of Appeals

Position 1
Judge Zachary Ives ran for a full term after being appointed by Governor Michelle Lujan Grisham on January 31, 2019.

Position 2
Judge Shammara Henderson ran for a full term after being appointed by Governor Michelle Lujan Grisham on February 14, 2020.

Position 3
Judge Jane Yohalem ran for a full term after being appointed by Governor Michelle Lujan Grisham on June 20, 2020.

Medina seat
Judge Jacqueline Medina won election to a full term in 2018. In order to be eligible for future terms, Judge Medina faced an uncontested retention election, where she needed at least 57% of the vote.

See also
 Elections in New Mexico
 Bilingual elections requirement for New Mexico (per Voting Rights Act Amendments of 2006)
 Politics of New Mexico
 Political party strength in New Mexico

References

External links
  (State affiliate of the U.S. League of Women Voters)
 
 
 
 

 
New Mexico